The Charities Aid Foundation (CAF) is a registered UK charity that operates in the United Kingdom, the United States of America and Canada. It works with companies, private philanthropists, regular donors, fellow foundations, governments, charities and not-for-profit enterprises to enable them to give more. Its stated purpose is to “accelerate progress in society towards a fair and sustainable future for all.” 

In late 2021, CAF was listed by the UK Charity Commission as the country’s fourth largest charity by income. It serves as regulatory experts to ensure funds reach charities and social enterprises as quickly and safely as possible via its charity validation which enables effective cross-border giving. CAF also wholly owns CAF Bank, a fully regulated bank that serves more than 14,000 UK-based charities and social enterprises.

CAF is known for its independence, expertise, and international reach, leading an international network of like-minded charitable organisations. CAF Group consists of Charities Aid Foundation and its subsidiaries in the UK including CAF Bank; CAF America; the CAF American Donor Fund and CAF Canada. CAF Group collectively seeks to inspire innovation, share best practice, and improve cross-border giving in support of civil society.

CAF’s head office is located in Kent, southeast of London and the charity has a second UK office in central London at St Bride Street, EC4A 4AD. 

In addition to offices in the UK, America, and Canada, CAF leads an international network of independent philanthropic organisations in several other countries. They include CAF Southern Africa, Good2Give (Australia and New Zealand), BCause (Bulgaria), IDIS (Brazil), and CAF India. 

As well as offering a range of services to charities, philanthropists and businesses, CAF also produces leading research into charitable giving. CAF produces the World Giving Index as well as the UK Giving report – the largest multi-year study of giving behaviour in the UK.

History 

In 1924, the National Council of Social Service set up a Charities Department to encourage efficient giving to charity. This department was later renamed the Charities Aid Fund while the National Council of Social Service became the National Council for Voluntary Organisations (NCVO). The Charities Aid Foundation took its current name in 1974 when it became a fully independent organisation.

Activities 

CAF provides services to charities, businesses and individuals in the UK and abroad, including help with fundraising, consultancy, and loans and grants.

Services to charities

CAF offers banking services through CAF Bank, a wholly-owned subsidiary of CAF that provides banking services to charities and social purpose organisations. The Bank offers transactional current and deposit accounts via telephone and internet banking, and provides lending to customers. In 2021, CAF Bank won Charities’ Bank of the Year at the Charity Times Awards. CAF Bank Limited is authorised by the Prudential Regulation Authority and regulated by the Financial Conduct Authority and the Prudential Regulation Authority.

CAF also owns and operates CAF Donate, an online donation processing platform giving charities the tools to fundraise through the web, mobile devices and Facebook and process donations received by post and phone.

Services to businesses

CAF consults with the world’s leading companies to help them articulate their purpose and put it into practice, delivering strategic corporate social responsibility (CSR), sustainability and community investment advice to businesses.

CAF works with the majority of FTSE100 to enable their corporate giving. Give As You Earn (GAYE) is the most popular payroll giving scheme in the UK, with over £1.3bn given since 1987. 

CAF Company Accounts enable companies to give tax effectively and to donate safely to any charitable organisation around the world. CAF also advises on setting up corporate foundations.

Services to individual donors

CAF gives expert advice on philanthropy and partners with wealth advisers to meet the charitable needs of their clients. 

CAF operates a Charity Account scheme, a system which acts like a current account for charitable giving. The account allows account holders to donate to legitimate charities through a personal account, by phone, post, or online, and can be opened with a minimum of £10. Donations are eligible for tax relief under the UK’s Gift Aid rules. 

Through the CAF Charitable Trust, CAF provides major donors with expert advice for their giving plans across the UK and internationally. CAF offers Donor Advised Fund services and legacy services for gifts from wills. In 2020-21, donations and legacies into charitable trusts increased by 26% to £222.9m. 

Financial journalist Martin Lewis works with CAF to manage the £10 million he pledged to charity following the sale of MoneySavingExpert.com.

The CAF American Donor Fund (CADF) offers tax-effective philanthropy services for dual UK and US taxpayers.

World Giving Index 
Working with pollster Gallup, CAF releases an annual global report of generosity, entitled the World Giving Index, that ranks most countries in the world across three measures: helping a stranger, donating money, and volunteering. CAF has been producing the World Giving Index since 2010.

UK Giving Report 
CAF’s research team has produced an annual report into giving behaviour in the UK – the largest study of its kind – since 2004. The UK Giving report is based on data sourced monthly through YouGov and highlights key trends that assist charities, policymakers, and wider society to better understand the UK’s changing giving landscape.

CAF’s UK Giving report is frequently cited by media, including The Guardian and the i.

Giving Tuesday 
CAF introduced the Giving Tuesday initiative in the UK in 2013 and led the campaign until 2021. The global day of giving - a global philanthropic initiative - raised a record-breaking US$3 billion in 2021.

Awards & Accreditation 
CAF is a member of the Financial Services Compensation Scheme (FSCS), the UK's deposit guarantee scheme.

CAF Bank was a finalist in the Best Charity Banking Provider category at the Moneyfacts Group's Business Moneyfacts Awards 2022. CAF Bank was also named Charity Bank of the year at the 2021 Charity Times Awards, and the CAF Bank Customer Service Team were finalists in the Institute of Customer Service's UK Customer Satisfaction Awards.

References

External links 
Charities Aid Foundation
CAF America
CAF Canada
CAF Southern Africa
Good2Give
BCause
IDIS
CAF India
TUSEV

1974 establishments in the United Kingdom
Charities based in the United Kingdom
Organisations based in Kent
Tonbridge and Malling